Rutkowski (feminine Rutkowska, plural: Rutkowscy) is a Polish toponymic surname denoting a person from the village of Rutki or Rutkowo.

Related surnames

Notable people
 Anne-Françoise Rutkowski (born 1970), French psychologist
 Arnold Rutkowski, Polish opera singer
 Denise Rutkowski (born 1962), American bodybuilder
 Dick Rutkowski, American scientist working in hyperbaric medicine, diving medicine and diver training
 Ed Rutkowski (born 1941), American football player
 Jadwiga Rutkowska (1934–2004), Polish volleyball player
 Jerzy Rutkowski (1914–1989), Polish political activist and resistance soldier
 Joanna Rutkowska (born 1981), Polish computer security researcher
 Katarzyna Rutkowska (born 1994), Polish long-distance runner
 Krzysztof Rutkowski (born 1960), Polish detective and politician
 Louise Rutkowski (born 1964), Scottish singer
 Łukasz Rutkowski (born 1988), Polish ski jumper
 Mariusz Rutkowski (born 1963), Polish canoeist
 Mateusz Rutkowski, Polish ski jumper
 Michał Rutkowski (born 1959), Polish economist and World Bank official
 Natalia Rutkowska (born 1991), Polish cyclist
 Tadeusz Rutkowski (born 1951), Polish weightlifter
 Walter Rutkowski (1917–1975), American politician
 Wanda-Marie-Émilie Rutkowska (1872–1902), French actress

See also
 Rutkowski Glacier, glacier in Antarctica
 
 

Polish-language surnames
Polish toponymic surnames